Donald Pippin may refer to:
Donald Pippin (Broadway director) (1926–2022), American theatre musical director and orchestral conductor
Donald Pippin (opera director) (1925–2021), American pianist and founder of Pocket Opera
Don Pippin, see Doris Day discography